Parasalenia is a genera of echinoderms belonging to the order Camarodonta.

Species
Parasalenia gratiosa 
Parasalenia poehlii

Fossils
 Parasalenia marianae

References

External links

Parasaleniidae
Echinoidea genera